= Addicted.pregnant.poor =

2015 book by Kelly Ray Knight

addicted.pregnant.poor
- First edition cover
- Authors: Kelly Ray Knight
- Language: English
- Subjects: Anthropology
- Publisher: Duke University Press
- Publication date: 2015
- Publication place: USA
- Media type: Print (hardcover, Paperback)
- Awards: Foundation for the Sociology of Health & Illness' Book of the Year Prize (2016)
- ISBN: 978-0822359531

addicted.pregnant.poor is a 2015 book by the medical anthropologist Kelly Ray Knight, published by Duke University Press. The book is an ethnographic study of women living in daily-rent hotels in San Francisco, examining entangled experiences of poverty, pregnancy, and addiction. The book was awarded the 2016 Foundation for the Sociology of Health & Illness Book of the Year Prize.

== Reception ==
Cara Kelly, writing in The Journal of Sociology & Social Welfare, said that "Knight explores the larger sociological constructs of how we understand addiction and mental illness in the United States in the 21st century" and examines how women are "viewed both as victims of their own histories, as well as perpetrators against their own children". Kelly summarised that "the book points to the need for larger public policy changes, and for the implementation of multidisciplinary coordinated efforts to support and improve the lives of these women and their children".

Sheila Katz, in a review for Contemporary Sociology: A Journal of Reviews, called addicted.pregnant.poor "a stunning ethnography" and praised how "Kelly Ray Knight uses her rich data to weave a spectacular book that spans the disciplines of anthropology, sociology, social work, public health, women’s studies, and urban studies and explores issues of poverty, pregnancy and motherhood, addiction and recovery, social policies, and qualitative methods." Katz summarised the book as "a must-read for researchers, students, policy-makers, and social service advocates" and called it "an outstanding contribution to the research in this area".

Melina Sherman, reviewing the book in Medicine Anthropology Theory, framed the book as "significant" in the context of there being "very few anthropological studies" that "have taken privately owned daily-rent hotels as their ethnographic sites". Sherman said that "what is most impressive about Knight’s book is the amount of time and effort she spends negotiating her own subject position", praising Knight's self-reflexivity and her critique of "sometimes 'vulturistic' anthropological pursuits". Sherman summarised that the book "offers a richly polyvocal account of addicted pregnancy" and said that it "takes an important step toward debunking the long-held assumption that addicts are inherently irrational subjects".

Janaé E. Bonsu reviewed the book for the journal Affilia. Bonsu wrote that "Knight presents a skillfully written ethnographic study" and "keeps the women's stories central and allows for their voices and self-definition to inform the work". Bonsu said that "Knight's capacity for storytelling is a significant strength" of the book. Similarly to Sherman's assessment, Bonsu praised Knight's "vulnerability and keen awareness of her various social positions as a medical anthropologist".

Writing in Wagadu: A Journal of Transnational Women's & Gender Studies, Treena Orchard suggested that the book "generates important new empirical and theoretical insights within the field of urban anthropology and will be useful to researchers, policy makers, and public health advocates". Orchard praised Knight for representing her participants "as active participants who make decisions and have desires that are their own". In a critical comment, however, Orchard wrote that "her silence on the legislative status of sex work is curious considering its integral orle in the systemic violence and margnialization her participants experience".

=== Awards ===
- Foundation for the Sociology of Health & Illness Book of the Year Prize (2016).
